Terrence Stephen McQueen (March 24, 1930November 7, 1980) was an American actor. His antihero persona, emphasized during the height of the counterculture of the 1960s, made him a top box-office draw for his films of the late 1950s, 1960s, and 1970s. He was nicknamed the "King of Cool" and used the alias Harvey Mushman in motor races.

McQueen received an Academy Award nomination for his role in The Sand Pebbles (1966). His other popular films include Love With the Proper Stranger (1963), The Cincinnati Kid (1965), Nevada Smith (1966), The Thomas Crown Affair (1968), Bullitt (1968), Le Mans (1971), The Getaway (1972), and Papillon (1973). In addition, he starred in the all-star ensemble films The Magnificent Seven (1960), The Great Escape (1963), and The Towering Inferno (1974).

In 1974, McQueen became the highest-paid movie star in the world, although he did not act in film for another four years. He was combative with directors and producers, but his popularity placed him in high demand and enabled him to command the largest salaries.

Early life
Terrence Stephen McQueen was born to a single mother on March 24, 1930, at St. Francis Hospital in Beech Grove, Indiana, a suburb of Indianapolis. McQueen, of Scottish descent, was raised a Roman Catholic. His parents never married. McQueen's father, William McQueen, a stunt pilot for a barnstorming flying circus, left his mother, Julia Ann (or Julianne) Crawford, six months after meeting her. Several biographers have stated that Julia Ann was an alcoholic. Unable to cope with caring for a small child, she left the boy with her parents (Victor and Lillian) in Slater, Missouri, in 1933. As the Great Depression worsened, McQueen and his grandparents moved in with Lillian's brother Claude and his family at their farm in Slater. McQueen later said that he had good memories of living on the farm, noting that his great-uncle Claude "was a very good man, very strong, very fair. I learned a lot from him."

Claude gave McQueen a red tricycle on his fourth birthday, a gift that McQueen subsequently credited with sparking his early interest in car racing. McQueen's mother married and when the boy was eight, she brought him from the farm to live with her and her new husband in Indianapolis. His great-uncle Claude gave McQueen a special gift at his departure. "The day I left the farm," he recalled, "Uncle Claude gave me a personal going-away present—a gold pocket watch, with an inscription inside the case." The inscription read "To Steve – who has been a son to me."

Dyslexic and partially deaf due to a childhood ear infection, McQueen did not adjust well to school or his new life. His stepfather beat him to such an extent that at the age of nine he left home to live on the streets. He later recalled, "When a kid doesn't have any love when he's small, he begins to wonder if he's good enough. My mother didn't love me, and I didn't have a father. I thought, 'Well, I must not be very good. Soon he was running with a street gang and committing acts of petty crime. Unable to control his behavior, his mother sent him back to her grandparents and great-uncle in Slater.

When McQueen was 12, Julia wrote to her uncle Claude, asking that her son be returned to her again to live in Los Angeles, California, where she lived with her second husband. By McQueen's own account, he and his new stepfather "locked horns immediately". McQueen recalls him being "a prime son of a bitch" who was not averse to using his fists on McQueen and his mother. As McQueen began to rebel again, he was sent back to live with Claude for a final time. At age 14, he left Claude's farm without saying goodbye and joined a circus for a short time. He drifted back to his mother and stepfather in Los Angeles—resuming his life as a gang member and petty criminal. McQueen was caught stealing hubcaps by the police and handed over to his stepfather, who beat him severely. He threw the youth  down a flight of stairs. McQueen looked up at his stepfather and said, "You lay your stinking hands on me again and I swear, I'll kill you."

After this incident, McQueen's stepfather persuaded his mother to sign a court order stating that McQueen was incorrigible, remanding him to the California Junior Boys Republic in Chino. Here, McQueen began to change and mature. He was not popular with the other boys at first: 

McQueen gradually became a role model and was elected to the Boys Council, a group who set the rules and regulations governing the boys' lives. He left the Boys Republic at age 16. When he later became famous as an actor, he regularly returned to talk to resident boys and retained a lifelong association with the center.

At age 16, McQueen returned to live with his mother, who had moved to Greenwich Village in New York City. There he met two sailors from the Merchant Marine and decided to sign on to a ship bound for the Dominican Republic. Once there, he abandoned his new post, eventually being employed in a brothel. Later McQueen made his way to Texas and drifted from job to job, including selling pens at a traveling carnival, and working as a lumberjack in Canada. He was arrested for vagrancy in the Deep South and served a 30-day assignment on a chain gang.

Military service
In 1947, after receiving permission from his mother (since he was not yet 18 years old), McQueen enlisted in the United States Marine Corps. He was sent to Parris Island for boot camp. He was promoted to private first class and assigned to an armored unit. He initially struggled with conforming to the discipline of the service, and was demoted to private seven times. He took an unauthorized absence, failing to return after a weekend pass expired. He was caught by the shore patrol while staying with a girlfriend (Barbara Ross) for two weeks. After resisting arrest, he was sentenced to 41 days in the brig.

After this, McQueen resolved to focus his energies on self-improvement and embraced the Marines' discipline. He saved the lives of five other Marines during an Arctic exercise, pulling them from a tank before it broke through ice into the sea. He was assigned to the honor guard responsible for guarding the presidential yacht of US President Harry S Truman. McQueen served until 1950, when he was honorably discharged. He later said he had enjoyed his time in the Marines. He remembered this period with the Marines as a formative time in his life, saying, "The Marines made a man out of me. I learned how to get along with others, and I had a platform to jump off of."

Acting

1950s and 1960s

In 1952, with financial assistance under the G.I. Bill, McQueen began studying acting in New York at Sanford Meisner's Neighborhood Playhouse and at HB Studio under Uta Hagen. He reportedly delivered his first dialogue on a theatre stage in a 1952 play produced by Yiddish theatre star Molly Picon. McQueen's character spoke one brief line: "Alts iz farloyrn." ("All is lost."). During this time, he also studied acting with Stella Adler, in whose class he met Gia Scala.

Long enamored of cars and motorcycles, McQueen began to earn money by competing in weekend motorcycle races at Long Island City Raceway. He purchased the first two of many motorcycles, a Harley-Davidson and a Triumph. He soon became an excellent racer, winning about $100 each weekend. He appeared as a musical judge in an episode of ABC's Jukebox Jury, which aired in the 1953–1954 season.

McQueen had minor roles in stage productions, including Peg o' My Heart, The Member of the Wedding, and Two Fingers of Pride. He made his Broadway debut in 1955 in the play A Hatful of Rain, starring Ben Gazzara.

In late 1955 at the age of 25, McQueen left New York and headed for Los Angeles. He moved into a house on Vestal Avenue in the Echo Park area, and sought acting jobs in Hollywood.

When McQueen appeared in a two-part Westinghouse Studio One television presentation entitled The Defenders, Hollywood manager Hilly Elkins took note of him and decided that B-movies would be a good place for the young actor to make his mark. McQueen's first role was a bit part in Somebody Up There Likes Me (1956), directed by Robert Wise and starring Paul Newman. McQueen was subsequently hired for the films Never Love a Stranger; The Blob (his first leading role, science fiction); and The Great St. Louis Bank Robbery (1959).

McQueen's first breakout role came on television. He appeared on Dale Robertson's NBC western series Tales of Wells Fargo as Bill Longley. Elkins, then McQueen's manager, successfully lobbied Vincent M. Fennelly, producer of the western series Trackdown, to have McQueen read for the part of bounty hunter Josh Randall. He first appeared in Season 1 Episode 21 of Trackdown in 1958. He appeared as Randall in that episode, cast opposite series lead Robert Culp, a former New York motorcycle racing buddy. McQueen appeared again on Trackdown in Episode 31 of the first season, in which he played twin brothers, one of whom was an outlaw sought by Culp's character, Hoby Gilman.

McQueen next filmed a pilot episode for what became the series titled Wanted: Dead or Alive, which aired on CBS in September 1958. This became his breakout role.

In interviews associated with the DVD release of Wanted, Robert Culp of Trackdown claims credit for bringing McQueen to Hollywood and landing him the part of Randall. He said he taught McQueen the "art of the fast-draw." He said that by the second day of filming, McQueen beat him at it. McQueen became a household name as a result of this series. Randall's special holster held a sawed-off .44–40 Winchester rifle nicknamed the "Mare's Leg" instead of the six-gun carried by the typical Western character, although the cartridges in the gunbelt were dummy .45–70, chosen because they "looked tougher." Coupled with the generally negative image of the bounty hunter, noted in the three-part DVD special on the background of the series, this added to the antihero image infused with mystery and detachment that made this show stand out from the typical TV Western. The 94 episodes that ran from 1958 until early 1961 kept McQueen steadily employed, and he became a fixture at the renowned Iverson Movie Ranch in Chatsworth, where much of the outdoor action for Wanted: Dead or Alive was shot.

At 29, McQueen got a significant break when Frank Sinatra removed Sammy Davis Jr. from the film Never So Few after Davis supposedly made some mildly negative remarks about Sinatra in a radio interview, and Davis's role went to McQueen. Sinatra saw something special in McQueen and ensured that the young actor got plenty of closeups in a role that earned McQueen favorable reviews. McQueen's character, Bill Ringa, was never more comfortable than when driving at high speed—in this case in a jeep—or handling a switchblade or a tommy gun.

After Never So Few, the film's director John Sturges cast McQueen in his next movie, promising to "give him the camera". The Magnificent Seven (1960), in which he played Vin Tanner and starred with Yul Brynner, Eli Wallach, Robert Vaughn, Charles Bronson, Horst Buchholz, and James Coburn, became McQueen's first major hit and led to his withdrawal from Wanted: Dead or Alive. McQueen's focused portrayal of the taciturn second lead catapulted his career. His added touches in many of the shots (such as shaking a shotgun round before loading it, repeatedly checking his gun while in the background of a shot, and wiping his hat rim) annoyed top-billed Brynner, who protested that McQueen was stealing scenes. (in his autobiography, Eli Wallach reports struggling to conceal his amusement while watching the filming of the funeral-procession scene where Brynner's and McQueen's characters first meet: Brynner was furious at McQueen's shotgun-round-shake, which effectively diverted the viewer's attention to McQueen. Brynner refused to draw his gun in the same scene with McQueen, not wanting his character outdrawn.

McQueen played the top-billed lead role in the next big Sturges film, 1963's The Great Escape, Hollywood's fictional depiction of the true story of a historic mass escape from a World War II POW camp, Stalag Luft III. Insurance concerns prevented McQueen from performing the film's notable motorcycle leap, which was done by his friend and fellow cycle enthusiast Bud Ekins, who resembled McQueen from a distance. When Johnny Carson later tried to congratulate McQueen for the jump during a broadcast of The Tonight Show, McQueen said, "It wasn't me. That was Bud Ekins." This film established McQueen's box-office clout and secured his status as a superstar.

Also in 1963, McQueen starred in Love with the Proper Stranger with Natalie Wood. He later appeared as the titular Nevada Smith, a character from Harold Robbins's novel The Carpetbaggers portrayed by Alan Ladd two years earlier in a movie version of that novel. Nevada Smith was an enormously successful Western action adventure prequel that also featured Karl Malden and Suzanne Pleshette. After starring in 1965's The Cincinnati Kid as a poker player, McQueen earned his only Academy Award nomination in 1966 for his role as an engine-room sailor in The Sand Pebbles, in which he starred opposite Candice Bergen and Richard Attenborough, whom he had previously worked with in The Great Escape.

He followed his Oscar nomination with 1968's Bullitt, one of his best-known films, and his personal favorite, which co-starred Jacqueline Bisset, Robert Vaughn, and Don Gordon. It featured an unprecedented (and endlessly imitated) car chase through San Francisco. Although McQueen did the driving that appeared in closeup, this was about 10% of what is seen in the film's car chase. The rest of the driving by McQueen's character was done by stunt drivers Bud Ekins and Loren Janes. The antagonist's black Dodge Charger was driven by veteran stunt driver Bill Hickman; McQueen, his stunt drivers and Hickman spent several days before the scene was shot practicing high-speed, close-quarters driving. Bullitt went so far over budget that Warner Brothers cancelled the contract on the rest of his films, seven in all.

When Bullitt became a huge box-office success, Warner Brothers tried to woo him back, but he refused, and his next film was made with an independent studio and released by United Artists. For this film, McQueen went for a change of image, playing a debonair role as a wealthy executive in The Thomas Crown Affair with Faye Dunaway in 1968. The following year, he made the southern period piece The Reivers.

1970s
In 1971, McQueen starred in the poorly received auto-racing drama Le Mans, followed by Junior Bonner in 1972, a story of an aging rodeo rider. He worked for director Sam Peckinpah again with the leading role in The Getaway, where he met future wife Ali MacGraw. He followed this with a physically demanding role as a Devil's Island prisoner in 1973's Papillon, featuring Dustin Hoffman as his character's tragic sidekick.

In 1973, The Rolling Stones referred to McQueen in the song "Star Star" from the album Goats Head Soup for which an amused McQueen reportedly gave personal permission. The lines were "Star fucker, star fucker, star fucker, star fucker, star / Yes you are, yes you are, yes you are / Yeah, Ali MacGraw got mad with you / For givin' head to Steve McQueen."

By the time of The Getaway, McQueen was the world's highest-paid actor, but after 1974's The Towering Inferno, starring with his long-time professional rival Paul Newman and reuniting him with Dunaway, became a tremendous box-office success, McQueen all but disappeared from the public eye, to focus on motorcycle racing and traveling around the country in a motor home and on his vintage Indian motorcycles. He did not return to acting until 1978 with An Enemy of the People, playing against type as a bearded, bespectacled 19th-century doctor in this adaptation of a Henrik Ibsen play. The film was never properly released theatrically, but has appeared occasionally on PBS.

His last two films were loosely based on true stories: Tom Horn, a Western adventure about a former Army scout-turned professional gunman who worked for the big cattle ranchers hunting down rustlers, and later hanged for murder in the shooting death of a sheepherder, and The Hunter, an urban action movie about a modern-day bounty hunter, both released in 1980.

Missed roles

McQueen was offered the lead male role in Breakfast at Tiffany's, but was unable to accept due to his Wanted: Dead or Alive contract (the role went to George Peppard). He turned down parts in Ocean's 11, Butch Cassidy and the Sundance Kid (his attorneys and agents could not agree with Paul Newman's attorneys and agents on top billing), The Driver, Apocalypse Now, California Split, Dirty Harry, A Bridge Too Far, The French Connection (he did not want to do another cop film), Close Encounters of the Third Kind and Sorcerer.

According to director John Frankenheimer and actor James Garner in bonus interviews for the DVD of the film Grand Prix, McQueen was Frankenheimer's first choice for the lead role of American Formula One race car driver Pete Aron. Frankenheimer was unable to meet with McQueen to offer him the role, so he sent Edward Lewis, his business partner and the producer of Grand Prix. McQueen and Lewis instantly clashed, the meeting was a disaster, and the role went to Garner.

Garner later for the interview said this:

Oh, McQueen. Crazy McQueen. McQueen and I get along pretty good, McQueen looked to me kind of like an older brother and he didn't want to have much with me, till he got into trouble, then he'd call and, you know, he knew, I could tell him just what I thought. A lot of people wouldn't do that. And then we had a falling out. It wasn't a falling out, as i did Grand Prix. Steve was originally slated to do that movie, but he couldn't get along with Frank Frankenheimer. So that lasted about 30 minutes, and I was in and Steve was out. And Steve went over to do Sand Pebbles, which went about year longer than they wanted to go. Big production spent a lot of money and stayed in China too long there, in Taiwan. So, when I got the part in Grand Prix, I called him. In Taiwan. And I started: "Steve, I want to tell you, before somebody else, that I'm going to do Grand Prix." Well, there was about a 20 dollars' silence there (laugh), on the telephone. He didn't know, what to say, and finally said "Oh, that's great, that's great, I'm glad to hear that.", because he planned to do Le Mans, which was another title at the time. But we were about to release, before he even got to that film. But he said: "Great, great, well, I'm glad to hear it; that's good. You know, if anybody's gonna do it, I'm glad, you're going to do it.

He didn't talk to me for about year and half, and we were next-door neighbors (laugh). So, it got to him a little bit, finally by his son. Chad took him to go see Grand Prix. And from that time on, we were talking again. But Steve was a wild kid. He didn't know where he wanted to be or what he wanted to do.

Director Steven Spielberg said McQueen was his first choice for the character of Roy Neary in Close Encounters of the Third Kind. According to Spielberg, in a documentary on the Close Encounters DVD, Spielberg met him at a bar, where McQueen drank beer after beer. Before leaving, McQueen told Spielberg that he could not accept the role because he was unable to cry on cue. Spielberg offered to take the crying scene out of the story, but McQueen demurred, saying that it was the best scene in the script. The role eventually went to Richard Dreyfuss.

William Friedkin wanted to cast McQueen as the lead in the action/thriller film Sorcerer (1977). Sorcerer was to be filmed primarily on location in the Dominican Republic, but McQueen did not want to be separated from Ali MacGraw for the duration of the shoot. McQueen then asked Friedkin to let MacGraw act as a producer, so she could be present during principal photography. Friedkin would not agree to this condition, and cast Roy Scheider instead of McQueen. Friedkin later remarked that not casting McQueen hurt the film's performance at the box office.

Spy novelist Jeremy Duns revealed that McQueen was considered for the lead role in a film adaptation of The Diamond Smugglers, written by James Bond creator Ian Fleming; McQueen would play John Blaize, a secret agent gone undercover to infiltrate a diamond-smuggling ring in South Africa. There were complications with the project which was eventually shelved, although a 1964 screenplay does exist.

McQueen and Barbra Streisand were tentatively cast in The Gauntlet, but the two could not get along, and both withdrew from the project. The lead roles were filled by Clint Eastwood and Sondra Locke.

McQueen expressed interest in the Rambo character in First Blood when David Morrell's novel appeared in 1972, but the producers rejected him because of his age. He was offered the title role in The Bodyguard (to star Diana Ross) when it was proposed in 1976, but the film did not reach production until years after McQueen's death (which eventually starred Kevin Costner and Whitney Houston in 1992). Quigley Down Under was in development as early as 1974, with McQueen in consideration for the lead, but by the time production began in 1980, McQueen was ill and the project was scrapped until a decade later, when Tom Selleck starred. McQueen was offered the lead in Raise the Titanic, but felt that the script was flat. He was under contract to Irwin Allen after appearing in The Towering Inferno and offered a part in a sequel in 1980, which he turned down. The film was scrapped and Newman was brought in by Allen to make When Time Ran Out, which was a box office bomb. McQueen died shortly after passing on The Towering Inferno 2.

Stunts, motor racing and flying

McQueen was an avid motorcycle and race car enthusiast. When he had the opportunity to drive in a movie, he performed many of his own stunts, including some of the car chases in Bullitt and the motorcycle chase in The Great Escape. Although the jump over the fence in The Great Escape was done by Bud Ekins for insurance purposes, McQueen did have considerable screen time riding his 650 cc Triumph TR6 Trophy motorcycle. It was difficult to find riders as skilled as McQueen. At one point, using editing, McQueen is seen in a German uniform chasing himself on another bike. Around half of the driving in Bullitt was performed by Loren Janes.

McQueen and John Sturges planned to make Day of the Champion, a movie about Formula One racing, but McQueen was busy with the delayed The Sand Pebbles. They had a contract with the German Nürburgring, and after John Frankenheimer shot scenes there for Grand Prix, the reels were turned over to Sturges. Frankenheimer was ahead in schedule, and the McQueen-Sturges project was called off.

McQueen considered being a professional race car driver. He had a one-off outing in the British Touring Car Championship in 1961, driving a BMC Mini at Brands Hatch, finishing third. In the 1970 12 Hours of Sebring race, Peter Revson and McQueen (driving with a cast on his left foot from a motorcycle accident two weeks earlier) won with a Porsche 908/02 in the three-litre class and missed winning overall by 21.1 seconds to Mario Andretti/Ignazio Giunti/Nino Vaccarella in a five-litre Ferrari 512S. This same Porsche 908 was entered by his production company Solar Productions as a camera car for Le Mans in the 1970 24 Hours of Le Mans later that year. McQueen wanted to drive a Porsche 917 with Jackie Stewart in that race, but the film backers threatened to pull their support if he did. Faced with the choice of driving for 24 hours in the race or driving for the entire summer making the film, McQueen opted for the latter.

McQueen competed in off-road motorcycle racing, frequently running a BSA Hornet and using alias Harvey Mushman. He was also set to co-drive in a Triumph 2500 PI for the British Leyland team in the 1970 London-Mexico rally, but had to turn it down due to movie commitments. His first off-road motorcycle was a Triumph 500 cc, purchased from Ekins. McQueen raced in many top off-road races on the West Coast, including the Baja 1000, the Mint 400, and the Elsinore Grand Prix.

In 1964, McQueen and Ekins were part of a four-rider (plus one reserve) first-ever official US team-entry into the Silver Vase category of the International Six Days Trial, an Enduro-type off-road motorcycling event held that year in Erfurt, East Germany. The "A" team arrived in England in late August to collect their mix of 649 cc and 490 cc twins from the Triumph factory before modifying them for off-road use. Initially let down with transport arrangements by a long-established English motorcycle dealer, Triumph dealer H&L Motors stepped-in to provide a suitable vehicle. On arrival in Germany, the team, with their English temporary manager, were surprised to find a Vase "B" team, comprising expat Americans living in Europe, had entered themselves privately to ride European-sourced machinery.

McQueen's ISDT competition number was 278, which was based on the trials starting order. Both teams crashed repeatedly. McQueen retired due to irreparable crash damage, and Ekins withdrew with a broken leg, both on day three (Wednesday). Only one member of the "B" team finished the six-day event. UK monthly magazine Motorcycle Sport commented: "Riding Triumph twins...[the team] rode everywhere with great dash, if not in admirable style, falling off frequently and obviously out for six days' sport without too many worries about who was going to win (they knew it would not be them)".

He was inducted in the Off-road Motorsports Hall of Fame in 1978. In 1971, McQueen's Solar Productions funded the classic motorcycle documentary On Any Sunday, in which McQueen is featured, along with racing legends Mert Lawwill and Malcolm Smith. The same year, he also appeared on the cover of Sports Illustrated magazine riding a Husqvarna dirt bike.

McQueen designed a motorsports bucket seat, for which a patent was issued in 1971.

In a segment filmed for The Ed Sullivan Show, McQueen drove Sullivan around a desert area in a dune buggy at high speed. Afterward, Sullivan said, "That was a 'helluva' ride!"

By testimony of McQueen's son, Chad, Steve owned around 100 classic motorcycles, as well as around 100 exotics and vintage cars, including:
 Porsche 917, Porsche 908, and Ferrari 512 race cars from the Le Mans film
 Porsche 911S (used in the opening sequence of the Le Mans film)
 1963 Ferrari 250 GT Berlinetta Lusso
 1967 Ferrari 275GTB/4
 1956 Jaguar XKSS (right-hand drive) (now on exhibit at the Petersen Automotive Museum in Los Angeles, California)
 1958 Porsche 356 Speedster 1600 Super (black exterior, interior and top) (McQueen drove the car in numerous SCCA racing events) (now in property of his son Chad)
 1968 Ford GT40 (Gulf liveried) (used in the Le Mans film)
 1953 Siata 208s (McQueen replaced the Siata badges with Ferrari badges and called it his "little Ferrari")
 1967 Mini Cooper-S (McQueen had the car customized by Lee Brown with changes including a single foglight, a wood dash, a recessed antenna and a custom brown paint job)
 1951 Chevrolet Styline De Lux Convertible (used in The Hunter, McQueen bought the car in 1979 after filming ended)
 1952 Chevrolet 3800 pickup camper conversion (McQueen used the truck for cross-country camping trips. It was the last car he rode in before his death)
1950 Hudson Commodore convertible
1952 Hudson Wasp 2-door sedan
 1953 Hudson Hornet 4-door Sedan
 1956 GMC Suburban
1958 GMC Pickup Truck (Reportedly one of McQueen's favorite cars, it is powered by a 336 Ci V8 which has been modified. The tag "MQ3188" is a reference to the ID number assigned to him when he was in reform school)
 1931 Lincoln Club Sedan
 1963 Lincoln Continental Sedan 
 1935 Chrysler Airflow Imperial Sedan
 1969 Chevrolet Baja Hickey race truck (originally debuted at the 1968 Mexican 1000 Rally and was driven by Cliff Coleman, Johnny Diaz, Mickey Thompson and others during its racing career; said to be the first truck specifically constructed by GM for use in the Mexican 1000; McQueen bought it from General Motors in 1970)

In spite of numerous attempts, McQueen was never able to purchase the Ford Mustang GT 390 he drove in Bullitt, which featured a modified drivetrain that suited McQueen's driving style. One of the two Mustangs used in the film was badly damaged, judged beyond repair, and believed to have been scrapped until it surfaced in Mexico in 2017, while the other one, which McQueen attempted to purchase in 1977, is hidden from the public eye. At the 2018 North American International Auto Show the GT 390 was displayed, in its current non-restored condition, with the 2019 Ford Mustang "Bullitt".

McQueen also flew and owned, among other aircraft, a 1945 Stearman, tail number N3188, (his student number in reform school), a 1946 Piper J-3 Cub, and an award-winning 1931 Pitcairn PA-8 biplane, flown in the US Mail Service by famed World War I flying ace Eddie Rickenbacker. They were hangared at Santa Paula Airport an hour northwest of Hollywood, where he lived his final days.

Personal life

Relationships and friendships

While still attending Stella Adler's school in New York, McQueen dated Gia Scala.

On November 2, 1956, he married Filipino actress and dancer Neile Adams, with whom he had a daughter, Terry Leslie (June 5, 1959 – March 19, 1998), and a son, Chad (born December 28, 1960). McQueen and Adams divorced in 1972. In her autobiography, My Husband, My Friend, Adams stated that she had an abortion in 1971, when their marriage was on the rocks. One of McQueen's four grandchildren is actor Steven R. McQueen (who is best known for playing Jeremy Gilbert in The Vampire Diaries and Jimmy Borelli in Chicago Fire).

Mamie Van Doren claimed to have had an affair with McQueen and tried hallucinogens with him around 1959. Actress-model Lauren Hutton also said that she had an affair with McQueen in the early 1960s. In 1971–1972, while separated from Adams, McQueen had a relationship with Junior Bonner co-star Barbara Leigh, which included her pregnancy and an abortion.

In Cheyenne, Wyoming in 1973, McQueen married actress Ali MacGraw, his co-star in The Getaway, but this marriage ended in a divorce in 1978. MacGraw suffered a miscarriage during their marriage. Some friends later claimed that MacGraw was the one true love of McQueen's life: "He was madly in love with her until the day he died."

In 1973, McQueen was one of the pallbearers at Bruce Lee's funeral along with James Coburn, Bruce's brother Robert Lee, Peter Chin, Dan Inosanto, and Taky Kimura.

After discovering a mutual interest in racing, McQueen and Great Escape co-star James Garner became good friends and lived near each other. McQueen recalled:

I could see that Jim was neat around his place. Flowers trimmed, no papers in the yard... grass always cut. So to piss him off, I'd start lobbing empty beer cans down the hill into his driveway. He'd have his drive all spick 'n' span when he left the house, then get home to find all these empty cans. Took him a long time to figure out it was me.

On January 16, 1980, less than a year before his death, McQueen married model Barbara Minty. Barbara Minty, in her book Steve McQueen: The Last Mile, wrote of McQueen becoming an Evangelical Christian toward the end of his life. This was due in part to the influences of his flying instructor, Sammy Mason, Mason's son Pete, and Barbara herself. McQueen attended his local church, Ventura Missionary Church, and was visited by evangelist Billy Graham shortly before his death.

Lifestyle

McQueen followed a daily two-hour exercise regimen, involving weightlifting and, at one point, running , seven days a week. McQueen learned the martial art Tang Soo Do from ninth-degree black belt Pat E. Johnson.

According to photographer William Claxton, McQueen smoked marijuana almost every day; biographer Marc Eliot stated that McQueen used a large amount of cocaine in the early 1970s. He was also a heavy cigarette smoker. McQueen sometimes drank to excess; he was arrested for driving while intoxicated in Anchorage, Alaska, in 1972.

Manson connection
Two months after Charles Manson incited the murder of five people, including McQueen's friends Sharon Tate and Jay Sebring, the media reported police had found a hit list with McQueen's name on it. According to his first wife, McQueen began carrying a handgun at all times in public, including at Sebring's funeral.

Charitable causes
McQueen had an unusual reputation for demanding free items in bulk from studios when agreeing to do a film, such as electric razors, jeans, and other items. It was later discovered McQueen donated these things to the Boys Republic reformatory school, where he had spent time during his teen years. McQueen made occasional visits to the school to spend time with the students, often to play pool and speak about his experiences.

Politics 
McQueen supported Lyndon B. Johnson in the 1964 United States presidential election and Richard Nixon in the 1968 United States presidential election.

Illness and death
McQueen developed a persistent cough in 1978. He gave up cigarettes and underwent antibiotic treatments without improvement. His shortness of breath grew more pronounced, and on December 22, 1979, after filming The Hunter, a biopsy revealed pleural mesothelioma, a cancer associated with asbestos exposure for which there is no known cure.

A few months later, McQueen gave a medical interview in which he blamed his condition on asbestos exposure. McQueen believed that asbestos used in movie sound stage insulation and race-drivers protective suits and helmets could have been involved but he thought it more likely that his illness was a direct result of massive exposure while removing asbestos lagging (insulation) from pipes aboard a troop ship while he served in the Marines.

By February 1980, evidence of widespread metastasis was found. He tried to keep the condition a secret but on March 11, 1980, the National Enquirer disclosed that he had "terminal cancer." In July 1980, McQueen traveled to Rosarito Beach, Mexico, for unconventional treatment after U.S. doctors told him they could do nothing to prolong his life. Controversy arose over the trip because McQueen sought treatment from William Donald Kelley, who was promoting a variation of the Gerson therapy that used coffee enemas, frequent washing with shampoos, daily injections of fluid containing live cells from cattle and sheep, massages, and laetrile, a reputed anti-cancer drug available in Mexico, but long known to be both toxic and ineffective at treating cancer. McQueen paid for Kelley's treatments by himself in cash payments which were said to have been upwards of $40,000 per month during his three-month stay in Mexico. Kelley's dental license, his only medically related license (until revoked in 1976) had been for orthodontics, a field of dentistry, not medicine. Kelley's methods caused a sensation in the traditional and tabloid press when it became known that McQueen was a patient.

McQueen returned to the U.S. in early October. Despite metastasis of the cancer throughout McQueen's body, Kelley publicly announced that McQueen would be completely cured and return to normal life. McQueen's condition soon worsened and huge tumors developed in his abdomen.

In late October 1980, McQueen flew to Ciudad Juárez, Chihuahua, Mexico to have an abdominal tumor on his liver (weighing around 5 lbs) removed, despite warnings from his U.S. doctors that the tumor was inoperable and his heart could not withstand the surgery. Using the name "Samuel Sheppard," McQueen checked into a small Juárez clinic where the doctors and staff were unaware of his actual identity.

On November 7, 1980, McQueen died of a heart attack at 3:45 a.m. at a Juárez hospital, 12 hours after surgery to remove or reduce numerous metastatic tumors in his neck and abdomen. He was 50 years old. According to the El Paso Times, McQueen died in his sleep.

Leonard DeWitt of the Ventura Missionary Church presided over McQueen's memorial service. McQueen was cremated, and his ashes were spread in the Pacific Ocean.

Legacy

In 2007, 27 years after his death, Forbes said McQueen remained a popular star and still the "king of cool" and was one of the highest-earning dead celebrities. A rights-management agency head credited Branded Entertainment Network (called Corbis at the time) with maximizing the profitability of his estate by limiting the licensing of McQueen's image, avoiding the commercial saturation of other dead celebrities' estates. As of 2007, McQueen's estate entered the top 10 of highest-earning dead celebrities.

McQueen was inducted into the Hall of Great Western Performers in April 2007 in a ceremony at the National Cowboy & Western Heritage Museum.

In November 1999, McQueen was inducted into the Motorcycle Hall of Fame. He was credited with contributions including financing the film On Any Sunday, supporting a team of off-road riders, and enhancing the public image of motorcycling overall.

A film based on unfinished storyboards and notes developed by McQueen before his death was slated for production by McG's production company Wonderland Sound and Vision. Yucatán is described as an "epic adventure heist" film, scheduled for release in 2013 but still unreleased in February 2016. Team Downey, the production company of Robert Downey, Jr. and his wife Susan Downey, expressed an interest in developing Yucatán for the screen.

The Beech Grove, Indiana, Public Library formally dedicated the Steve McQueen Birthplace Collection on March 16, 2010, to commemorate the 80th anniversary of McQueen's birth on March 24, 1930.

In 2012, McQueen was posthumously honored with the Warren Zevon Tribute Award by the Asbestos Disease Awareness Organization (ADAO).

Steve McQueen: The Man & Le Mans, a 2015 documentary, examines the actor's quest to create and star in the 1971 auto-racing film Le Mans. His son Chad McQueen and former wife Neile Adams are among those interviewed.

On September 28, 2017, there was a selected showing in some theaters of his life story and spiritual quest, Steve McQueen – American Icon. There was an encore presentation on October 10, 2017. The film received mostly positive reviews. Kenneth R. Morefield of Christianity Today said it "offers a timeless reminder that even those among us living the most celebrated lives often long for the peace and sense of purpose that only God can provide". Michael Foust of Wordslingers called it "one of the most powerful and inspiring documentaries I've ever seen."

In the 2019 Quentin Tarantino film Once Upon a Time in Hollywood, McQueen is portrayed by Damian Lewis. McQueen also appears as a character in Tarantino's novel of the same name.

Archive
The Academy Film Archive houses the Steve McQueen-Neile Adams Collection, which consists of personal prints and home movies. The archive has preserved several of McQueen's home movies.

Ford commercials
In 1998, director Paul Street created a commercial for the Ford Puma. Footage was shot in modern-day San Francisco, set to the theme music from Bullitt. Archive footage of McQueen was used to digitally superimpose him driving and exiting the car in settings reminiscent of the film. The Puma shares the same number plate of the classic fastback Mustang used in Bullitt, and as he parks in the garage (next to the Mustang), he pauses and looks meaningfully at a motorcycle tucked in the corner, similar to that used in The Great Escape.

In 2005, Ford used his likeness again, in a commercial for the 2005 Mustang. In the commercial, a farmer builds a winding racetrack, which he circles in the 2005 Mustang. Out of the cornfield comes McQueen. The farmer tosses his keys to McQueen, who drives off in the new Mustang. McQueen's likeness was created using a body double (Dan Holsten) and digital editing. Ford secured the rights to McQueen's likeness from the actor's estate licensing agent for an undisclosed sum.

At the Detroit Auto Show in January 2018, Ford unveiled the new 2019 Mustang Bullitt. The company called on McQueen's granddaughter, actress Molly McQueen, to make the announcement. After a brief rundown of the tribute car's particulars, a short film was shown in which Molly was introduced to the actual Bullitt Mustang, a 1968 Mustang Fastback with a 390 cubic-inch engine and a four-speed manual gearbox. That car has been in possession of the same family since 1974 and hidden away from the public until then, when it was driven out from under the press stand and up the center aisle of Ford's booth to much fanfare.

Memorabilia

Motorcycles and cars 

One of his motorcycles, a 1937 Crocker, sold for a world-record price of $276,500 at the same auction. McQueen's 1963 metallic-brown Ferrari 250 GT Lusso Berlinetta sold for US$2.31 million at auction on August 16, 2007. Except for three motorcycles sold with other memorabilia in 2006, most of McQueen's collection of 130 motorcycles was sold four years after his death. The 1970 Porsche 911S purchased while making the film Le Mans and appearing in the opening sequence was sold at auction in August 2011 for $1.375 million. From 1995 to 2011, McQueen's red 1957 fuel-injected Chevrolet convertible was displayed at the Petersen Automotive Museum in Los Angeles in a special Cars of Steve McQueen exhibit. It is now in the collection of actress Ruth Buzzi and her husband Kent Perkins. McQueen's British racing green 1956 Jaguar XKSS is located in the Petersen Automotive Museum and is in drivable condition, having been driven by Jay Leno in an episode of Jay Leno's Garage. In August 2019, Mecum Auctions announced it would auction the Bullitt Mustang Hero Car at its Kissimmee auction, held January 2–12, 2020. The car sold without reserve for $3.4 million ($3.74 million after commissions and fees).

Watches 

McQueen was a sponsored ambassador for Heuer watches. In the 1971 film Le Mans, he famously wore a blue-faced Monaco Ref. 1133, which led to its cult status among watch collectors, purchasing six watches of the same model for the shoot of the film. On December 12, 2020, one of the last six models sold and one of two held in private hands was sold for a record US$2.208 million at a Phillips auction in New York City, becoming the most expensive Heuer watch sold at auction. Tag Heuer continues to promote its Monaco range with McQueen's image.

The Rolex Explorer II, Reference 1655, known as Rolex Steve McQueen in the horology collectors' world, the Rolex Submariner, Reference 5512, which McQueen was often photographed wearing in private moments, sold for $234,000 at auction on June 11, 2009, a world-record price for the type. 

In June 2018, Phillips announced McQueen's Rolex Submariner to hit the auction block in September that year. However, there was controversy whether or not the watch was his personal watch worn by McQueen himself or if the watch was bought, engraved, then gifted. Phillips later removed the watch from the auction block.

Among McQueen's other watches was a Hanhart 417 chronograph.

Sunglasses 

The blue-tinted sunglasses (Persol 714) worn by McQueen in the 1968 film The Thomas Crown Affair sold at a Bonhams & Butterfields auction in Los Angeles for $70,200 in 2006.

Filmography

Awards and honors
Academy Awards
 (1967) Nominated – Best Actor in a Leading Role in The Sand Pebbles

Golden Globe Awards
 (1964) Nominated – Best Actor – Motion Picture Drama in Love with the Proper Stranger
 (1967) Nominated – Best Actor – Motion Picture Drama in The Sand Pebbles
 (1970) Nominated – Best Actor – Motion Picture Musical or Comedy in The Reivers
 (1974) Nominated – Best Actor – Motion Picture Drama in Papillon

Moscow International Film Festival
 (1963) – Won – Best Actor in The Great Escape

References

Bibliography 
 
 
 
 
Terrill, Marshall (2020). Steve McQueen: In His Own Words. Deerfield, IL: Dalton Watson. .

Further reading
 Beaver, Jim. Steve McQueen. Films in Review, August–September 1981.
 Satchell, Tim. McQueen. (Sidgwick and Jackson Limited, 1981) 
 Siegel, Mike. Steve McQueen: The Actor and his Films (Dalton Watson, 2011)
 Nolan, William F. McQueen (Congdon & Weed, 1984)
 
 Terrill, Marshall. Steve McQueen: Portrait of an American Rebel, (Donald I. Fine, 1993)
 Terrill, Marshall. Steve McQueen: The Last Mile', (Dalton Watson, 2006)
 Terrill, Marshall. Steve McQueen: A Tribute to the King of Cool, (Dalton Watson, 2010)
 Terrill, Marshall. Steve McQueen: The Life and Legacy of a Hollywood Icon'', (Triumph Books, 2010)
Terrill, Marshall. Steve McQueen: In His Own Words, (Dalton Watson, 2020)

External links

 
Steve McQueen: In His Own Words by Marshall Terrill
 
 
 Steve McQueen at Virtual History
 Bell System Film "A Family Affair", McQueen's debut, at The AT&T Tech Channel
 The Great Escape – New publication with private photos of the shooting & documents of 2nd unit cameraman Walter Riml  
 Photos of the filming The Great Escape, Steve McQueen on the set
 Photos and commentary on Steve McQueen shooting an episode of Wanted: Dead or Alive on the Iverson Movie Ranch

1930 births
1980 deaths
20th-century American male actors
American male film actors
American male television actors
American motorcycle racers
American people of Scottish descent
American sailors
American tang soo do practitioners
British Touring Car Championship drivers
California Republicans
Converts to Christianity
Deaths from cancer in Mexico
Deaths from mesothelioma
Enduro riders
Former Roman Catholics
Male actors from Indiana
Male actors from Indianapolis
Male actors from Los Angeles
Male actors from Missouri
Male Western (genre) film actors
Military personnel from Indiana
Neighborhood Playhouse School of the Theatre alumni
Off-road motorcycle racers
Off-road racing drivers
People from Beech Grove, Indiana
People from Echo Park, Los Angeles
People from Saline County, Missouri
Racing drivers from California
Racing drivers from Indiana
Racing drivers from Los Angeles
Racing drivers from Missouri
United States Marines
United States Merchant Mariners
United States Merchant Mariners of World War II
Western (genre) television actors
World record setters in motorcycling
World Sportscar Championship drivers
Actors with dyslexia